Mohamad Fazli bin Mohamad Salleh (born 4 November 1986) is a Malaysian engineer and politician.

Fazli was born in Kg Jalan Raja, Bukit Pasir, Johor and used to work at Tenaga Nasional. He was elected Member of the Johor State Legislative Assembly for Bukit Pasir at the 2022 state election. He was appointed one of the Johor State Executive Councilor on 26 March 2022.

Election results

References 

Living people
Malaysian politicians
Malaysian people of Malay descent
Malaysian Muslims
1986 births